Joseph Gerald Branch II (died November 22, 1867; also known as Joseph Gerald Branch III and Joseph Branch II) was a state  legislator in Florida at the age of 21, worked as a lawyer, and had a plantation in Desha, Arkansas. He was assassinated on his plantation. His father was Joseph Branch, a lawyer and the first attorney general in Florida.

Joseph Branch was in the Branch family that included North Carolina Governor John Branch and Confederate Army Brigadier General Lawrence O'Bryan Branch.

He married Mary Polk, also of a prominent family. They lived on the plantations of Branch's in-laws and had many slaves.

References

American planters
American slave owners
People murdered in Arkansas
Year of birth missing
1867 deaths